August Viljam Koskinen (17 November 1878 in Laukaa – 24 October 1949) was a Finnish carpenter and politician. He was a member of the Parliament of Finland from 1919 to 1922, representing the Social Democratic Party of Finland (SDP).

References

1878 births
1949 deaths
People from Laukaa
People from Vaasa Province (Grand Duchy of Finland)
Social Democratic Party of Finland politicians
Members of the Parliament of Finland (1919–22)